The Big Fix is a 1978 American political comedy thriller film directed by Jeremy Kagan and based on the novel by Roger L. Simon, who dramatized his own novel for the screen. It stars Richard Dreyfuss as private detective Moses Wine and co-stars Susan Anspach, Bonnie Bedelia, John Lithgow, and F. Murray Abraham.

Plot

Former student radical Moses Wine now works as a private investigator. He is contacted by Lila, an ex-girlfriend from his college days, who is working in the election campaign for Miles Hawthorne, a politician who is running to be Governor of California. Lila takes Moses to meet Hawthorne's campaign coordinator Sam Sebastian, who is concerned about a fake campaign flyer supposedly showing former Berkeley radical Howard Eppis together with Hawthorne and endorsing him. Knowing that Moses was a former contemporary of Eppis, Sam hires him to find out if Eppis is behind it.

Eppis was one of a notorious group of radicals known as the California Four and has been in hiding for years. Moses sets about trying to track him down by contacting some of his old associates. He is given the name of Oscar Procari, the son of a businessman and a supporter of Eppis, who proves elusive. Meanwhile, Moses and Lila visit the printing company and trace the order for the flyers to an electronics store owned by a Korean man, Harold Pak Chung, who disappears after Moses tracks him to a casino. Moses then finds Lila murdered in her apartment. Later he meets with Sam, who seems more concerned about the publicity and the effect it will have on Hawthorne's campaign. Rather than be fired, Moses quits.

Moses encounters a woman named Alora and discovers she is the niece of another of the California Four, Luis Vasquez, who says that her uncle met Lila on the night she died and has now disappeared. Procari's father contacts Moses and they meet. Procari says that he hasn't seen his son in years and blames Eppis for turning his son away from him. Procari offers to pay Moses to find his son, but Moses declines. Meanwhile Sam re-hires Moses as Eppis has contacted him threatening a series of bombings but that the police think it is a hoax.

Sam gives him a typewritten note with an address, which Moses visits and discovers Eppis now living a comfortable suburban lifestyle and no longer a radical. Moses is followed to the address by two hitmen, who burst in and try to kill them, but leave when Moses triggers an alarm. The hitmen try to kill Moses again at his office, but Alora and her associates ambush them. They interrogate the hitmen and find they were hired by Pak Chung and that they killed Lila when they kidnapped Vasquez, but don't know where he is being held.

Moses calls the police to warn them about the bombings. Pak Chung has rigged a van with explosives and drives it by remote control while Luis Vasquez is unconscious  at the wheel. Moses finds Pak Chung near one of the target sites and kills him before he can carry out the bombing. A tape recording is found nearby supposedly by Eppis claiming responsibility for the bombing. Later Sam reveals himself as Oscar Procari and that his father was behind Pak Chung and the attempt to fix the election by implicating Hawthorne with Eppis.

Cast
 Richard Dreyfuss as Moses Wine
 Susan Anspach as Lila Shea
 Bonnie Bedelia as Suzanne
 John Lithgow as Sam Sebastian
 Ofelia Medina as Alora
 Nicolas Coster as Nicholas Spitzler
 F. Murray Abraham as Howard Eppis
 Fritz Weaver as Oscar Procari Sr.
 Ron Rifkin as Randy Esterhaus

Reception
The Big Fix received fairly positive critical reviews. On Rotten Tomatoes, the film holds a rating of 88% from 16 reviews.

References

External links
 
 
 
 

1978 films
1978 comedy-drama films
American comedy-drama films
American political thriller films
1970s comedy mystery films
American detective films
1970s English-language films
Films scored by Bill Conti
Films directed by Jeremy Kagan
Films set in Los Angeles
Universal Pictures films
American neo-noir films
1970s American films